MIT World Peace University (MIT-WPU) is a state private university (deemed university) located in Kothrud, Pune, India. It is a part of the MIT Group of Institutions.

It is officially named Dr. Vishwanath Karad MIT World Peace University. It was established under the Government of Maharashtra Act No. XXXV 2017 and recognized by the University Grants Commission.

History

Evolution as university
MIT World Peace University was formerly known as the (Maharashtra Institute of Technology) group of institutions. Maharashtra Institute of Technology (MIT), established in 1983, was the first college of the MAEER's group of institutions and one of the first private engineering colleges in Maharashtra. MAEER was affiliated with Savitribai Phule Pune University (SPPU), turned into a private university, the MIT Art Design Technology University under the guidance of Dr. Vishwanath Karad.

Raj Kapoor Family Memorial at Rajbaugh 

Raj Kapoor and his parents' Samadhi (memorial) is at their family farm "Rajbaugh", which means the "king of gardens". Located inside the MIT World Peace University (MIT-WPU), Rajbaugh lies off the NH65 on the banks of Mula-Mutha River in Loni Kalbhor village 30 km east of Pune in Maharshtra. Kapoor family sold a part of the 125 acres Rajbaugh to MIT-WPU which built a memorial for the Kapoor family on its campus. The memorial was unveiled in 2014 in the presence of Lata Mangeshkar and the Kapoor clan. The Kapoor family memorial has 7 pagodas showing elements of Raj Kapoor's movies and a museum or viewing gallery which shows family photographs and moments from his movie making from 1945 to 1990. Raj Kapoor shot many of his films at this farm, including Mera Naam Joker, Bobby, Satyam Shivam Sundaram, Prem Rog and more. Kapoor's family bungalow inside the farm has been preserved. The popular song "Hum Tum Ek Kamre Mein Band Ho" was shot inside this bungalow.

Departments
Maharashtra Institute of Technology - World Peace University's (MIT-WPU) Departments include:

 School of Engineering and Technology
 Department of Civil Engineering
 Department of Mechanical Engineering
 Department of Chemical Engineering
 Department of Material Science Engineering
 Department of Electrical and Electronics Engineering
 Department of Petroleum Engineering
 Department of Polytechnic

 School of Computer Engineering and Technology
 Department of Computer Engineering and Technology
 Department of Computer Science and Applications

 School of Leadership
 Premium MBA 
 Executive Education  
 Doctoral Programs

 School of Business
 Department of Business 
 Department of Hospitality Management

 School of Management
 Department of Commerce
 Department of Economics / Institute of Economics
 Department of Public Policy
 Department of Sustainability studies

 School of Government

 School of Health Science
 Department of Pharmacy
 Department of Public Health 
 Department of Yogic Science
 Department of Clinical Psychology

 School of Science
 Department of Mathematics and Statistics
 Department of Biology
 Department of Physics Department of Chemistry

 School of Design
 Department of Design
 Department of Visual Arts

 School of Liberal Arts
 Department of Liberal Arts 
 Department of Education
 Department of Photography
 Department of Media and Communication

 School of Law

 School of Consciousness

MIT-WPU Faculty of Engineering
The Faculty of Engineering consists of two colleges Maharashtra Institute of Technology, Pune & MIT College of Engineering, Pune. The MIT campus also houses World Peace Centre, The UNESCO chair for Human Rights, Democracy, Peace and Tolerance.

Maharashtra Institute of Technology, Pune was established in 1983 and MIT College of Engineering was established in 2001. In 2017, the MIT Group of Institutes was awarded university status and both the colleges were merged to form the MIT-WPU Faculty of Engineering. MIT College of Engineering, Pune was the first educational institute to set up the CollabCAD Training & Support Centre in the State of Maharashtra.

Academic departments include the Centre for Management Studies & Research

Teachers and faculties are involved in various R&D activities like writing research proposals for submission to UOP, DST, AICTE, IBM, DBT, UGC etc., as well as publishing and presenting research papers in National and International Conferences. There are research collaborations and lectures conducted in MITCOE for the benefit of MITCOE-ts in association with different organizations like MIR Labs, IEEE, and UOP.

Cultural activities like Dramatics, Literary Arts and Music as well as Sports and other activities are very important in every MITCOE-t's life. MITCOE-ts also have been participating in Firodiya Karandak an inter-collegiate competition where students showcase their talents through plays.  MITCOE-ts' regularly participate in linguistic and Marathi play competitions like Purshottam Karandtak.  MITCOE remained in the top three ranks of Purshottam karandtak and was the winner of its 2011 edition.

Student clubs include:
Cosmos: astronomy club
IEEE student branch
Robotics Club
Spandan (magazine club)
MIT CREON (art and literary club)
Club Felix
Acceleracers
Shutterbugs: club for photography, videography and graphic design
Students are also involved in activities with external bodies including SAE International, ISTE, IETE, and CSI.

MITCIE regularly takes part in an international robotics event called ROBOCON hosted by MIT in association with Asia Pacific Broadcasting Union (ABU). The event gets televised on Doordarshan (Prasarbharati) and colleges from 16 nations send robotics teams to take part in this competition. In 2010 a specially dedicated lab for Robocon have been added to the MITCOE. In 2012 MIT college of engineering Robocon team was ranked 6th & in 2013, 14th among 80 engineering colleges including IIT's and NIT's nationwide.

The technical event of MITCOE is called TESLA, which includes competitions, workshops and seminars. It was formerly known as Pinnacle and is scheduled in September each year. Participants from many colleges of India come to take part in this technical event.

School of Management (UG)
At the World Peace University, the courses offered are BBA, BBA-IB, and BBA-CA. Courses usually also offer dual specialisations such as Entrepreneurship, Corporate Social Responsibility, Sports Management and Travel & Tourism.

Rankings

The National Institutional Ranking Framework (NIRF) ranked it 116 among engineering colleges in 2022.

See also
 List of educational institutions in Pune

References

External links 
 
 MIT Pune
 Aarohan,  is MIT-WPU's cultural fest.
'IEEE | MIT College of Engineering SB, Pune represents the student branch for an international organization, Institute of Electrical and Electronics Engineers (IEEE).

Engineering colleges in Pune
Educational institutions established in 1983
1983 establishments in Maharashtra
Universities and colleges in Pune